is a 1996 Japanese film written, edited and directed by Takeshi Kitano. The film was made directly after Kitano recovered from a motorcycle wreck that left one side of his body paralyzed. After undergoing extensive surgery and physical therapy, he quickly went about making Kids Return amidst speculation that he might never be able to work again. The movie is about two high school dropouts, Masaru (Ken Kaneko) and Shinji (Masanobu Andō), who try to find a direction and meaning in their lives—one by becoming a yakuza lieutenant, the other by becoming a boxer.

The music was composed by Joe Hisaishi, and the cinematographer was Katsumi Yanagishima.

Plot
Shinji and Masaru are high school delinquents, terrifying their classmates, stealing money, and even setting their teacher's car on fire. After some of their victims hire a boxer to beat up Masaru, he decides to get revenge, and takes his shy friend Shinji along with him to a boxing gym. To their trainers' surprise, Shinji is naturally-talented at boxing and easily defeats Masaru in a sparring session. Masaru encourages his friend to keep going at it, and quits boxing, opting instead to join the yakuza. As Shinji focuses on becoming a successful boxer, Masaru aims to become a gang leader, and their paths diverge.

While the two of them climb to the top in their respective areas, Shinji adopts an unhealthy lifestyle that results in the end of his boxing career. Likewise, Masaru's arrogance and disrespect for his boss gets him kicked out of the yakuza. In the end, they are both left with nothing, and meet again. As they ride their bike together in the schoolyard, Shinji wonders if this is the end of their lives, but Masaru assures him that "it's only the beginning".

Cast and roles
 Ken Kaneko as Masaru
 Masanobu Andō as Shinji
 Leo Morimoto as Teacher
 Hatsuo Yamatani as boxing club manager (credited as Hatsuo Yamaya)
 Michisuke Kashiwaya as Hiroshi
 Mitsuko Oka as coffee-shop owner, Sachiko's mother
 Yūko Daike as Sachiko
 Ryo Ishibashi as local Yakuza chief
 Susumu Terajima as No. 2 in local gang
 Moro Morooka as Hayashi
 Peking Genji	
 Atsuki Ueda as Reiko
 Kotaro Yoshida
 Koichi Shigehisa as Trainer
 Kyōsuke Yabe
 Yoshitaka Ōtsuka as delinquent
 Masami Shimojō as Yakuza godfather
 Kazuki Oh
 Shintarō Hasegawa
 Kanji Tsuda
 Yojin Hino as taxi office worker (credited as Yōjin Hino)
 Ren Osugi as taxi passenger
 Takashi Hagino

Soundtrack

All compositions by Joe Hisaishi.
"Meet Again" − 5:02
"Graduation" − 1:07
"Angel Doll" − 2:21
"Alone" − 1:15
"As a Rival" − 1:29
"Promise... for Us" − 5:08
"Next Round" − 1:28
"Destiny" − 3:31
"I Don't Care" − 2:18
"High Spirits" − 2:03
"Defeat" − 2:29
"Break Down" − 3:46
"No Way Out" − 2:51
"The Day After" − 0:44
"Kids Return" − 4:40

Reception

Critical reception
At the time of its release, Kids Return was Takeshi Kitano's most successful film yet in his native Japan, which until then had been notedly less enthusiastic about his films than international viewers. Rotten Tomatoes gives this film a 100% approval rating based on reviews from five critics, with an average score of 7.8 out of 10. David Wood, writing for the BBC, described it as "a tender, funny and melancholy affair which will come as a delight to ardent admirers after the recent Kikujiro." He gave the film 4 out of 5 stars.

Accolades
At the 1997 Japanese Academy Awards, Kids Return was nominated for three awards and won two of them.

Sequel
In 2013 a sequel to the film titled Kids Return: The Reunion was released, directed by the assistant director of the original, Hiroshi Shimizu. It is set ten years after the original and follows an older Shinji (Yuta Hiraoka) and Masaru (Takahiro Miura). The two of them meet after their failures in boxing and crime, respectively, and they work together to improve their situation. The new film was created with minimal input from Kitano.

References

External links

 
 

Reviews
Nippon Cinema
Review by Boris Trbic at Senses of Cinema

1996 films
1990s sports films
1990s Japanese-language films
Japanese high school films
Japanese boxing films
Films directed by Takeshi Kitano
Yakuza films
Films scored by Joe Hisaishi
1990s Japanese films